Luis Iván Arana Zúñiga (born in Mexico City, Mexico), (born June 21, 1987) is a Mexican actor (Television and film)

Filmography

Film roles

Television roles

References

External links 

1987 births
Living people
Mexican male film actors
Mexican male telenovela actors
Mexican male television actors
21st-century Mexican male actors
Male actors from Mexico City